Chan Kwong Ho (born 31 December 1996) is a former Hong Kong professional footballer who played as a striker.

Club career
Chan joined Wong Tai Sin's academy as a U13 player, eventually earning his a professional contract with the club on 7 December 2015. He did not make any appearances for the club and was released after the club was relegated at the end of the season.

On 25 August 2018, Chan was officially announced as a Yuen Long player. In the preseason, he was asked by head coach Kenneth Kwok to switch from defensive midfield to striker. Chan rewarded his manager by scoring on his debut in a 4–4 draw against Tai Po on 2 September 2018.

On 31 May 2019, Southern announced that Chan had signed with the club.

International career
Chan made his international debut for the Hong Kong national team on 11 June 2019, in a friendly match against Chinese Taipei.

Personal life
Chan grew up in the Wong Tai Sin area of Hong Kong. He graduated from the district's Ng Wah Catholic Secondary School in 2016.

References

External links

Chan Kwong Ho at HKFA

1996 births
Living people
Hong Kong people
Association football forwards
Hong Kong footballers
Hong Kong international footballers
Hong Kong First Division League players
Hong Kong Premier League players
Resources Capital FC players
Yuen Long FC players
Southern District FC players